Calmasuchus is a genus of capitosaurian temnospondyl which lived during the middle Triassic (lower-middle Anisian age). Fossils of Calmasuchus have been recovered from the La Mora site of the Catalan basin in Barcelona of Spain. Identified from a partial skull roof and palate (holotype IPS-37401 (LM-83)), skull fragments (IPS-37401 (LM-63, LM-101, L and M1)) and complete hemi-mandible (IPS-12 42407 (LM-4)), it was named by Josep Fortuny, Àngel Galobart and Carles De Santisteban in 2011. The type species is Calmasuchus acri.

References

Fossil taxa described in 2011
Triassic temnospondyls of Europe
Prehistoric amphibian genera
Anisian life